Ke Kā o Makalii is a Hawaiian constellation consisting of five stars in a curving formation in the shape of a bailer surrounding the western constellation Orion, although not including any stars from it. The constellation is seen to rise in the east like a cup and set in the west pouring onto the western horizon.

Ke Kā o Makali‘i comprises five stars:
 Capella (Hawaiian: Hoku-lei)
 Beta Aurigae (Hawaiian: Na Mahoe, or Nana-mua-ma), 
 Castor (Hawaiian: Nana-mua)
 Pollux (Hawaiian: Nana-hope)
Procyon (Hawaiian: Puana)
 Sirius (Hawaiian: ‘A‘a)

References

Polynesian navigation
Polynesian culture
Constellations